Royal Air Force Ta Kali was a Royal Air Force fighter operations base located on the island of Malta, which started life in 1940 as a diversion airstrip for the main operating bases such as RAF Luqa. Other diversion airstrips similar in function to Ta Kali were located at RAF Hal Far and on Malta's second island of Gozo at Xewkija airfield. The base's name reflects an anglicised corruption of the correct Maltese spelling of Ta' Qali, other phonetic variants of the correct name also appear regularly.

History

Pre-War Use
Ta' Qali originally had an unpaved airstrip before the outbreak of hostilities in 1939. The original airfield was built on a dried lake bed in the interior of the island on reasonably featureless plain situated between Rabat and Valletta. Before the war it was used by civil aircraft, but its runway surface became unusable in heavy rain and so it was improved somewhat by the RAF.

Second World War
The former civil aviation facility was renamed RAF Station Ta Kali on 8 November 1940.

RAF Ta Kali was developed at a time when Malta was under intense aerial bombardment and Malta's Air Command needed to have alternative diversion airstrips on Malta, as the RAF's main operating bases were being bombed. Airfield improvements started in 1940 and for the next three years the RAF base was heavily developed.

The following fighter squadrons were based at RAF Ta Kali:
 261 Squadron RAF being the first unit relocated from RAF Luqa on 20 November 1940.  
 249 Squadron RAF arrived from the UK to replace 261 Squadron in May 1941.  249 Squadron would be one of the most successful RAF fighter units on Malta.
 272 Squadron RAF equipped with Bristol Beaufighter Mark VIFs were occasionally diverted to Ta' Qali.
 The RAF Regiment formed a unit at RAF Ta Kali in 1942.

RAF Ta Kali remained a target for Axis aircraft attacks during the height of the siege.

Post war
Control of the airfield would transfer to the Royal Navy's Fleet Air Arm in 1945 as a shore establishment known as HMS Goldfinch, event subsequently it was be returned to RAF ownership in 1953. It was closed as an active RAF base in 1968.  In 1952 RAF Gloster Meteor T7s were based at Ta' Qali. 601, 609 and 613 Royal Auxiliary Air Force Squadrons RAF all deployed to Ta' Qali with their Gloster Meteor and de Havilland Vampire fighter aircraft during annual summer training camps in the early 1950s.  The base was handed over to the Maltese Government in 1968.

Current use
The former Ta' Qali airbase now hosts the Malta Aviation Museum, a highly popular venue for aviation and military history enthusiasts. Part of the site hosts the Malta Fairs & Conventions Centre.

There is also a craft village in some of the airfield's WW2-vintage support buildings.

See also
 AHQ Malta
 Siege of Malta (World War II)
 Ta' Qali
 RAF Luqa

References

External links
Malta's Wartime Airfields
RAF Luqa Remembered
Malta Aviation Museum
Malta War Museum

Defunct airports
Military installations of Malta
World War II sites in Malta
Attard
Royal Air Force stations in Europe
Airports in Malta
Malta–United Kingdom military relations